William Gay (born January 1, 1985) is an American football coach and former cornerback, who is the current defensive backs coach for the Missouri State Bears. He played college football for the University of Louisville for head coach Bobby Petrino from 2003 to 2006 before being drafted by the Pittsburgh Steelers in the fifth round of the 2007 NFL Draft. He would later win Super Bowl XLIII with the team over the Arizona Cardinals.

Gay signed with the Cardinals prior to the 2012 NFL season before returning to Pittsburgh the following year.

Early years
Gay attended James S. Rickards High School in Tallahassee, Florida, where he played quarterback, wide receiver and safety for the Raiders. He racked up over 1,200 all-purpose yards and 12 touchdowns as a junior. He notched 1,035 yards and seven scores passing, 1,237 yards and 11 scores receiving and 82 tackles, 14 pass breakups and nine interceptions at defensive back as a senior when he was named team co-MVP and earned first team All-Big Bend Area honors.

Gay was also a standout in track & field. In 2002, he placed 8th in the 200-meter dash with a time of 22.61 seconds at the Capital City Classic. At the FHSAA Region 3A he took 3rd in the long jump (7.07m or 23 feet, 2 inches) and 14th in the 400-meter dash (51.0 seconds). He was also clocked at 4.4 in the 40-yard dash.

Gay was rated as a three-star prospect by TheInsiders.com and was the nation's 67th-ranked cornerback. He was rated as a three-star prospect and was the nation's 46th-ranked cornerback by Rivals.com.

College career
Gay played college football at the University of Louisville where he played in 46 games recording 134 tackles. Gay is also somewhat notable for being offside as a defender on a field goal kick attempt in the final minute of Louisville's game against Rutgers in 2006.  Although the kick was unsuccessful, a penalty was called against Louisville that provided the kicker with a second attempt.  This one was successful.  As a result, Louisville experienced their only loss of the season, effectively ending their bid for a National Championship game berth.

Professional career

Pittsburgh Steelers

2007
Gay was selected by the Pittsburgh Steelers in the fifth round (170th overall) in the 2007 NFL Draft. On July 22, 2007, the Steelers signed Gay to a three-year, $1.221 million contract. In his first preseason game he intercepted a Tyler Palko pass and tackled Saints first round draft pick Robert Meachem.

He began his rookie season as the fifth cornerback behind Ike Taylor, Deshea Townsend, Bryant McFadden, and Ricardo Colclough. Gay played his first regular season game in the season opener at Cleveland. In a 34–7 win over the Cleveland Browns, he made his first career tackle and pass deflection. During a Week 7 matchup with the Denver Broncos, he made a season-high 4 tackles. In his rookie year he played in 16 games recording 19 tackles and 2 pass deflections.

2008
In Gay's second year, he saw more significant playing time after injuries to cornerbacks Bryant McFadden and Deshea Townsend. Gay contributed to the Steelers' stingy defense, which was the first in the league in pass defense and best total defense. Gay also contributed on special teams. On November 16, 2008, he received his first career start and made 3 tackles in a game against the San Diego Chargers. On December 14, 2008, Gay made his first career interception and returned it for 12-yards against the Baltimore Ravens.

The Steelers ended Gay's second season 12-4 and finished first amongst the AFC North. On January 18, 2009, Gay played in his first AFC Championship and recorded one tackle, as the Steelers beat the Ravens 23–14. On February 1, 2009, Gay played in his first Super Bowl and racked up 2 tackles. The Steelers went on to beat the Arizona Cardinals 27–23 to win Super Bowl XLIII.

He finished his second season with 41 tackles, 33 solo tackles, 7 pass deflections, and an interception in 4 starts. Gay also played in every game for the Steelers in 2008.

2009
After Bryant McFadden left via free agency for the Arizona Cardinals during the 2009 off-season, Gay assumed the starting duties at cornerback for the season opposite Ike Taylor. Gay started his first season opener and recorded 4 tackles in the Steelers' 13–10 victory over the Tennessee Titans. He went on to start the next 14 regular season games, as he finished the season with a career-high 78 tackles, 70 solo tackles, a sack, and 10 pass deflections.

2010
On April 16, 2010, he was signed to a one-year, $1.101 million contract by the Steelers. Gay did not start at cornerback until Week 11 against the Oakland Raiders, as Bryant McFadden had re-signed with the Steelers prior to the start of the season. After recording three solo tackles, Gay returned to start the next three games. On January 23, 2011, he started his first career playoff game and recorded two tackles in a 24-19 AFC Championship win over the New York Jets. On February 6, 2011, Gay started in his first career Super Bowl. The Steelers went on to lose Super Bowl XLV to the Green Bay Packers with Gay finishing the game with two tackles and a pass deflection.

He finished 2010 with 48 tackles, 40 solo tackles, a career-high 2 sacks, and 11 pass deflections in 16 games and 4 starts.

2011
On August 1, 2011, Gay signed a one-year, $735,000 contract with the Steelers. In his fourth year, Gay started a career-high 15 games. While playing a Week 11 contest at Cincinnati, he recorded 3 tackles and returned an interception for 12-yards in a 24–17 win over the Bengals. On December 5, 2011, he went on to have one of his best games for the Steelers, as he made a season-high seven tackles, five solo tackles, three pass deflections, and an interception in a 14–3 victory over the Cleveland Browns. He finished 2011 with 61 tackles, 49 solo tackles, a career-high 13 pass deflections, and two interceptions.

Arizona Cardinals
On March 24, 2012, Gay signed a two-year, $3.2 million contract with the Arizona Cardinals. The move reunited him with former Steelers teammate and new Cardinals defensive backs coach Deshea Townsend. 
On September 9, 2012, Gay made his regular season debut for the Cardinals and accumulated 7 tackles, a pass deflection, and a forced fumble in a win over the Seattle Seahawks. He played his last game for the Cardinals on December 30, 2012, and finished the game with 4 tackles. In his only year in Arizona, he had 57 tackles, 45 solo tackles, a sack, 6 pass deflections, and 2 interceptions. Gay was released on March 1, 2013.

Pittsburgh Steelers (second stint)

2013
On March 4, 2013, Gay signed a three-year, $4.5 million contract, with the Pittsburgh Steelers. It also included a $500,000 signing bonus and $500,000 guaranteed. During a Week 10 game against the Buffalo Bills, Gay had a career-high 11 tackles, a career-high nine solo tackles, and a pass deflection.  In a week 12 game against the  Cleveland Browns Gay scored his first touchdown on an interception of Brandon Weeden.

2014
Gay began the 2014 season as the third cornerback behind Ike Taylor and Cortez Allen. On September 28, 2014, he received his first start of the season against the Tampa Bay Buccaneers after Taylor broke his forearm the previous game. He finished the loss with four solo tackles and two pass deflections and remained the starter for the rest of the season. On October 26, 2014, Gay made a season-high eight tackles, six solo tackles, and had his second career touchdown when he returned an interception for 33-yards in a 51–34 victory over the Indianapolis Colts. He also gained some spotlight for his unique celebration dance.

While playing at Atlanta on December 14, 2014, Gay had a season-high 8 solo tackles and returned his third interception of the season for a career-high 52-yard touchdown against the Falcons. This gave him the most interceptions returned for touchdowns in the 2014 NFL season and the most in a single season in Steelers history.

He finished the season with 59 combined tackles, 12 pass deflections, three interceptions, and three touchdowns in 16 games and 13 starts.

2015
Following the retirement of longtime teammate Ike Taylor, Gay became the Steelers' number one cornerback for the 2015 season. On December 13, 2015, Gay intercepted Bengals quarterback A. J. McCarron in the third quarter and returned it for a touchdown. This tied him with Pro Football Hall of Famer Rod Woodson for most career interceptions returned for touchdowns for the Pittsburgh Steelers.

In his first season as the Steelers' starting corner, he finished with a total of 58 combined tackles, one sack, seven pass deflections, two interceptions, and one touchdown while starting all 16 regular season games.

2016
Gay began the season as the Steelers starting cornerback. On November 6, 2016, Gay was supplanted as the starter and delegated to the nickel corner with the emergence of Ross Cockrell and rookie Artie Burns.

Gay finished the 2016 season playing in all 16 games, starting nine, and making 42 tackles, one sack, seven passes defended, and an interception. Pro Football Focus gave Gay an overall grade of 83.7, which ranked 15th among all qualifying cornerbacks in 2016. This marked his highest overall grade from PFF during his career.

2017
Gay entered training camp competing with Cockrell, Mike Hilton, and Cameron Sutton for a backup cornerback position. He began the regular season as the fourth cornerback on the depth chart, behind Joe Haden, Burns, and nickel corner Hilton, and was used in primarily dime packages throughout the first five games. In Week 2, against the Minnesota Vikings, Gay forced a fumble by wide receiver Adam Thielen which was recovered by the Steelers in the fourth quarter of their 26–9 victory.

On March 14, 2018, Gay was released by the Steelers.

New York Giants
On April 5, 2018, Gay was signed by the New York Giants. On September 2, 2018, he was released by the Giants.

Personal life
Gay's mother was murdered in a domestic violence incident when he was eight years old. Apparently, Gay and his siblings knew nothing about the domestic violence occurring in his home, but at the urging of other family members, and out of fear for her children, she left her boyfriend—the father of Gay's brother. While she was at a friend's house shortly after leaving, her boyfriend arrived at the friend's house and shot her three times. The boyfriend then went back to his car and killed himself. In an effort to keep them together his grandmother took the brothers in and raised them. He shared his story in a video for the Women's Center and Shelter of Greater Pittsburgh in an attempt to spread the word on domestic violence..

In 2018, Gay became engaged to track and field star Natasha Hastings, an Olympic Gold medalist and World Champion. The couple never married.

References

External links
Pittsburgh Steelers bio
Missouri State Bears bio

1985 births
Living people
African-American players of American football
American football cornerbacks
Arizona Cardinals players
Louisville Cardinals football players
New York Giants players
Pittsburgh Steelers players
Players of American football from Tallahassee, Florida
Missouri State Bears football coaches
21st-century African-American sportspeople
20th-century African-American people
Ed Block Courage Award recipients